Tim Schleicher (born 30 December 1988, in Nuremberg) is a German freestyle wrestler. He competed in the freestyle 60 kg event at the 2012 Summer Olympics; he lost to Toghrul Asgarov in the 1/8 finals and was eliminated by Kenichi Yumoto in the second repechage round.

References

External links
 

1988 births
Living people
German male sport wrestlers
Olympic wrestlers of Germany
Wrestlers at the 2012 Summer Olympics
Sportspeople from Nuremberg